Ostriker is a surname. Notable people with this name include:
Alicia Ostriker (born 1937), American poet, married to Jeremiah, mother of Eve
David M. Ostriker (born 1947), American documentary filmmaker, winner of 2003 Donald Brittain Award, brother of Jeremiah
Eve Ostriker (born 1965), American astrophysicist, daughter of Alicia and Jeremiah
Jeremiah P. Ostriker (born 1937), American astrophysicist, married to Alicia, father of Eve, brother of David
Jon Ostriker, American correspondence chess player, ICCF U.S.A. grandmaster

See also
12146 Ostriker, asteroid named for Jeremiah
Ostriker–Peebles criterion for formation of barred galaxies, named after Jeremiah
Ostriker–Vishniac effect, distortion of cosmic background, named after Jeremiah
Österreicher (surname)